En Swasa Kaatre is a 1999 Indian Tamil-language romantic crime film written and directed by K. S. Ravi. The film stars Arvind Swamy and Isha Koppikar, while Raghuvaran, Prakash Raj and Thalaivasal Vijay play supporting roles. The film was produced by newcomers R. M. Sait and Ansar Ali, friends of composer A. R. Rahman. The film released in February 1999 to mixed reviews.

Plot

A seemingly down-to-earth man Arun (Arvind Swamy), leads a life of a computer hacker by day and a thief by night. When he meets Madhu (Isha Koppikar), whom he fancies, he wishes to turn over a new leaf. But Arun's rogue brother Guru (Prakash Raj), who has been blackmailing him since young to do his dirty deeds, does not think likewise. A deep love-hate relationship between them which unfolded during their childhood days, traps Arun into a life of crime.  How Arun chooses between his family and love forms the crux of the story.

Cast

Arvind Swamy as Arun Raj
Isha Koppikar as Madhu
Prakash Raj as Guru
Raghuvaran as Paneer
Vadivelu
Thalaivasal Vijay
Devan as ACP
Vennira Aadai Nirmala
Chinni Jayanth
Santhana Bharathi
O. A. K. Sundar
Priyanka as Lily
Raju Sundaram as Raju (special appearance)
Mink Brar as item number "Jumbalakka"
Japan Kumar (special appearance in the song "Jumbalakka")
Diya Mirza in a special appearance (uncredited)

Production
In 1998, composer A. R. Rahman signed on to work with his friends R. M. Sait and Anwar Ali's Love Letter, with speculation suggesting that Rahman was producing this film along with his friends. Rahman suggested to his friends to instate K. S. Ravi as director, having previously worked with him in Mr. Romeo (1996). The project went through production troubles, with three of Arvind Swamy's projects at the time  - Engineer, Mudhal Mudhalaaga and Sasanam - also in a similar situation. The film was soon retitled En Swasa Kaatre and was rumoured to be partially based on the Mission Impossible films. Isha Koppikar was meant to mark her debut with the film but the delays prompted her other films to release before En Swasa Kaatre. Director Kathir had scouted for an actress in North India to play the lead role in his venture Kadhalar Dhinam and had auditioned Isha Koppikar for the role. He subsequently recommended her to his friend K. S. Ravi to cast her in En Swasa Kaatre. Sonali Bendre replaced Isha in Kadhalar Dhinam.

The film was also delayed due to a dispute between Arvind Swamy and Nikaba Films, the producers. Nikaba had omitted to pay Arvind Swamy's remuneration for acting in the film, and the actor promptly got a stay order on the release of the producer's next film Ooty.

Release
The film received mixed reviews with The Deccan Herald cited that "the story of En Swasa Katre, is one with much potential, largely unexplored by an inadequate plot and screenplay, which, along with the dialogues, and direction, are by K S Ravi", with the critic adding that "Arvind Swamy is not bad, as for as an Arvind Swamy can be so. And the same goes for Prakash Raj. Worth taking a look at." Moreover, Indolnik.com claimed that "the dialogues and situations are unbelievably ill-conceived, but played straight by everyone around, which makes it unintentionally funny! Arvind Swamy looks bored half way through the movie. Prakash Raj hams his way through another over the top performance." The New Indian Express describes that "En Swasa Kaatre may not be a must-see but it is certainly a can-see." New Straits Times wrote "See this one if you are a Arvindswamy fan or go just to enjoy the visuals".

The film did average commercial business. Despite the relative high-profile nature of the film, the director K. S. Ravi disappeared from the film industry after the film's release and did not make any other films until his death in 2010. The film became Arvind Swamy's final Tamil film in a leading role before his retirement, with the much-delayed Sasanam releasing in 2006.

Music 

The soundtrack features six songs composed by A. R. Rahman, with lyrics by Vairamuthu and Vaali. Parts of the song "En Swasa Katre" are syncopated as in Carnatic music compositions . In the Theendai song, Rahman had used a similar religious chant which had carnatic allusions like the ones in Enigma (Germany), which had Gregorian chants.

The song "Jumbalakka" was reused in the Hindi film Thakshak. It was also featured in the 2019 film Kaithi where it became a trend in Tamil Nadu after its release. "Kadhal Niagra" was reused with change in instrumentation and vocals and with a considerable extend in length as "Kay Sera Sera" in Pukar. An instrumental theme song was featured in the movie but not released in the cassettes. A slightly revised version of "Thirakatha" was a song that was used in the score of Million Dollar Arm.

Due to Rahman's busy schedule, he left the project before completing the background score. Sabesh–Murali were signed to quickly compose the remaining score and received credits for "additional background score".

References

External links

1990s Tamil-language films
1999 crime films
1999 films
1999 romance films
Films about organised crime in India
Films directed by K. S. Ravi
Films scored by A. R. Rahman
Indian crime films
Romantic crime films